Hypospila dochmotoma is a species of moth in the family Erebidae. It is found in Australia, where it has been recorded from Queensland.

References

Moths described in 1939
Hypospila